The 2006–07 Deutsche Eishockey Liga season was the 13th season since the founding of the Deutsche Eishockey Liga (DEL). The league was played with 14 clubs in the 2006–07 season, the same number as the previous season. However, in place of the Kassel Huskies, who were relegated the previous season, the Straubing Tigers took part in the competition, having won the 2nd Bundesliga in 2005–06. The format had slightly changed from the previous season. Each club played the other four times, resulting in 52 regular-season games per club. The top six clubs at the end of the regular season qualified for the first round of the play-offs. The clubs seven to ten played a preliminary round to determine the last two places for the first round. For the teams placed eleven to fourteen, the season ended.

No club was relegated from the DEL this season and the Adler Mannheim won its 5th DEL Championship.

Regular season

 Abbreviations: P = Games played, OTW = Overtime win, PW = Win after penalty shootout, OTL = Overtime loss, PL = Loss after penalty shoutout, GF = Goals for, GA = Goals against, (C) = Defending champion, (N) = New club
 Source:

Play-offs
The four rounds of the 2006-07 play-offs were played under the following system:
 Preliminary round: Best-of-three
 First round: Best-of-seven
 Semi finals: Best-of-five
 Finals: Best-of-five
Like the regular season, in the play-offs games will be decided by penalty shoot-outs (P) after a five-minute overtime (OT) sudden-death. In all play-off rounds the higher placed team from the regular season has home advantage in the uneven numbered games (Game 1, 3, 5, 7) and the other team in the even numbered games (Game 2, 4, 6).

Preliminary round

First round

Semi finals

Finals

 The Adler Mannheim are the 2006-07 champions of the DEL.

Play-off tree

Top scorers
The five highest placed scores in the regular season and play-offs are:

Regular season

Play-offs

1
Ger
Deutsche Eishockey Liga seasons